Ruspolia is a genus of bush crickets in the subfamily Conocephalinae. This genus includes species that may be called 'cone-heads', but the name has also been used for Conocephalus and other genera in the subfamily.

Distribution
The genus has a widespread distribution with species found in most continents (except N. America and Antarctica).

Species 
The Orthoptera species file lists:
 Ruspolia abruptus Walker, 1869
 Ruspolia ampla Walker, 1869
 Ruspolia aostae Karny, 1920
 Ruspolia baileyi Otte, 1997
 Ruspolia basiguttata Bolívar, 1906
 Ruspolia brachixipha Redtenbacher, 1891
 Ruspolia breviceps Walker, 1870
 Ruspolia consobrina Walker, 1869
 Ruspolia differens Serville, 1838
 Ruspolia diversa Walker, 1869
 Ruspolia dubia Redtenbacher, 1891
 Ruspolia egregius Karny, 1907
 Ruspolia exigua Bolívar, 1922
 Ruspolia flavovirens Karny, 1907
 Ruspolia fuscopunctata Karny, 1907
 Ruspolia halmaherae Brunner von Wattenwyl, 1898
 Ruspolia indicator Walker, 1869
 Ruspolia insularis Walker, 1869
 Ruspolia intactus Walker, 1869
 Ruspolia interruptus Walker, 1869
 Ruspolia jaegeri Roy, 1971
 Ruspolia kashmira Shah, Usmani, Ali & Dar, 2021
 Ruspolia knipperi Otte, 1996 - nomen dubium
 Ruspolia latiarma Bailey, 1975
 Ruspolia lemairei Griffini, 1909
 Ruspolia liangshanensis Lian & Liu, 1992
 Ruspolia lineosa Walker, 1869
 Ruspolia macroxiphus Redtenbacher, 1891
 Ruspolia madagassa Redtenbacher, 1891
 Ruspolia marshallae Bailey, 1980
 Ruspolia nitidula Scopoli, 1786
 Ruspolia paraplesia Karny, 1907
 Ruspolia persimilis Griffini, 1909
 Ruspolia praeligata Bolívar, 1922
 Ruspolia pulchella Karny, 1907
 Ruspolia punctipennis Chopard, 1954
 Ruspolia pygmaea Schulthess Schindler, 1898 - type species
 Ruspolia pyrgocorypha Karny, 1920
 Ruspolia ruthae Bailey, 1975
 Ruspolia sarae Bailey, 1975
 Ruspolia subampla Bailey, 1975
 Ruspolia yunnana Lian & Liu, 1992

References

 
Orthoptera genera
Orthoptera of Africa
Orthoptera of Europe
Orthoptera of Asia